Apostolos Koulpas (born 23 February 1996) is a Greek professional footballer who plays as a centre-back for Gamma Ethniki club Iraklis Larissa.

References

1996 births
Living people
Greek footballers
Football League (Greece) players
Super League Greece 2 players
Trikala F.C. players
Apollon Larissa F.C. players
Association football defenders